Davenport High School is the name of several high schools in the United States:

 Davenport Central High School (est. 1904), this was the school commonly referred to as "Davenport High School" prior to Davenport, Iowa's decentralization of the school district
 Davenport North High School (est. 1985), in Davenport, Iowa
 Davenport West High School (est. 1960), in Davenport, Iowa
 Davenport Mid City High School (est. 2014), in Davenport, Iowa
 Davenport High School (Oklahoma), in Davenport, Oklahoma
 Davenport High School (Washington), in Davenport, Washington